Alone in the Dark is an upcoming survival horror game developed by Pieces Interactive and published by THQ Nordic. The game is set to release on PlayStation 5, Xbox Series X/S, and Microsoft Windows. It is the seventh mainline entry in the Alone in the Dark franchise following Alone in the Dark: Illumination.

Story
The game follows Emily Hartwood and private investigator Edward Carnby as they travel to Derceto Manor, a home for the mentally fatigued, to investigate the disappearance of Jeremy Hartwood, Emily's uncle.

Gameplay 
Alone in the Dark will feature an "over-the-shoulder" third-person perspective, similar to the recent remakes in the Resident Evil franchise, combat is available with a firearm, or melee weapon as shown by the reveal trailer.

Development 
Three years after the poor reception of Alone in the Dark: Illumination, the former publisher, Atari S.A. sold the rights to THQ Nordic on September 2018. Pieces Interactive, which was most known for making Magicka 2, commenced the game's development in 2019. The team was inspired by the success of Resident Evil 2 in 2019, and Resident Evil 3 in 2020. The game was written by Mikael Hedberg, who had previously worked at Frictional Games on Soma and Amnesia: The Dark Descent. It will feature an original plot which incorporates characters from the first three Alone in the Dark games. Artist Guy Davis was recruited to design the monsters featured in the game.

In August 2022, it was revealed at THQ Nordic's Showcase.

References

External link
 

Upcoming video games
PlayStation 5 games
Alone in the Dark
Video games set in Louisiana
Cthulhu Mythos video games
Xbox Series X and Series S games
Windows games
Video games set in 1924
Psychological horror games
Video games about zombies
Single-player video games
Video games featuring female protagonists
THQ Nordic games
Survival horror video games